Daniel Michael Mulumba (26 August 1962 – 1 May 2012) was the first Ugandan swimmer to compete at the Olympic Games.He competed in the men's 100 metre freestyle at the 1984 Summer Olympics.

Mulumba was born in Kampala in August 1962. After attending Nakasero Primary School, he moved to Namasagali College for his secondary and  education. He attained a Bachelor of Science Degree in Business Administration from Pepperdine University in Southern California.

References

External links
 

1962 births
2012 deaths
Ugandan male swimmers
Olympic swimmers of Uganda
Swimmers at the 1984 Summer Olympics
Place of birth missing
20th-century Ugandan people
21st-century Ugandan people